José Martiniano de Alencar (May 1, 1829 – December 12, 1877) was a Brazilian lawyer, politician, orator, novelist and dramatist. He is considered to be one of the most famous and influential Brazilian Romantic novelists of the 19th century, and a major exponent of the literary tradition known as "Indianism". Sometimes he signed his works with the pen name Erasmo. He was patron of the 23rd chair of the Brazilian Academy of Letters.

Biography

José Martiniano de Alencar was born in Messejana, Fortaleza, Ceará, on May 1, 1829, to politician José Martiniano Pereira de Alencar and his cousin Ana Josefina de Alencar.  His family was a rich and influential clan in Northeastern Brazil, his grandmother being famous landowner Barbara Pereira de Alencar, heroine of the Pernambucan Revolution. Moving to São Paulo in 1844, he graduated in Law at the Faculdade de Direito da Universidade de São Paulo in 1850 and started his career in law in Rio de Janeiro. Invited by his friend Francisco Otaviano, he became a collaborator for the journal Correio Mercantil. He also wrote many chronicles for the Diário do Rio de Janeiro and the Jornal do Commercio. Alencar would compile all the chronicles he wrote for these newspapers in 1874, under the name Ao Correr da Pena.

It was in the Diário do Rio de Janeiro, during the year of 1856, that Alencar gained notoriety, writing the Cartas sobre A Confederação dos Tamoios, under the pseudonym Ig. In them, he bitterly criticized the homonymous poem by Gonçalves de Magalhães. Even the Brazilian Emperor Pedro II, who esteemed Magalhães very much, participated in this polemic, albeit under a pseudonym. Also in 1856, he wrote and published under feuilleton form his first romance, Cinco Minutos, that received critical acclaim. In the following year, his breakthrough novel, O Guarani, was released; it would be adapted into a famous opera by Brazilian composer Antônio Carlos Gomes 13 years later. O Guarani would be first novel of what is informally called Alencar's "Indianist Trilogy" – a series of three novels by Alencar that focused on the foundations of the Brazilian nation, and on its indigenous peoples and culture. The other two novels, Iracema and Ubirajara, would be published on 1865 and 1874, respectively. Although called a trilogy, the three books are unrelated in their plots.

Alencar was affiliated with the Conservative Party of Brazil, being elected as a general deputy for Ceará. He was the Brazilian Minister of Justice from 1868 to 1870, having famously opposed the abolition of slavery. He also planned to be a senator, but Pedro II never appointed him, under the pretext of Alencar being too young; with his feelings hurt, he would abandon politics later.

He was very close friends with the also famous writer Machado de Assis, who wrote an article in 1866 praising his novel Iracema, that was published the year before, comparing his Indianist works to Gonçalves Dias, saying that "Alencar was in prose what Dias was in poetry". When Assis founded the Brazilian Academy of Letters in 1897, he chose Alencar as the patron of his chair.

In 1864 he married Georgina Augusta Cochrane, daughter of an eccentric British aristocrat. They would have six children – Augusto (who would be the Brazilian Minister of External Relations in 1919, and also the Brazilian ambassador in the United States from 1920 to 1924), Clarisse, Ceci, Elisa, Mário (who would be a journalist and writer, and a member of the Brazilian Academy of Letters) and Adélia. (It is implied that Mário de Alencar was actually an illegitimate son of Machado de Assis, a fact that inspired Assis to write his famous novel Dom Casmurro.)

Alencar died in Rio de Janeiro in 1877, a victim of tuberculosis. A theatre in Fortaleza, the Theatro José de Alencar, was named after him. His works were marked by the influence of his Roman Catholic faith.

Works

Novels
 Cinco Minutos (1856)
 A Viuvinha (1857)
 O Guarani (1857)
 Lucíola (1862)
 Diva (1864)
 Iracema (1865)
 As Minas de Prata (1865 — 1866)
 O Gaúcho (1870)
 A Pata da Gazela (1870)
 O Tronco do Ipê (1871)
 A Guerra dos Mascates (1871 — 1873)
 Til (1871)
 Sonhos d'Ouro (1872)
 Alfarrábios (1873)
 Ubirajara (1874)
 O Sertanejo (1875)
 Senhora (1875)
 Encarnação (1893 — posthumous)

Theatre plays
 O Crédito (1857)
 Verso e Reverso (1857)
 O Demônio Familiar (1857)
 As Asas de um Anjo (1858)
 Mãe (1860)
 A Expiação (1867)
 O Jesuíta (1875)

Chronicles
 Ao Correr da Pena (1874)

Autobiography
 Como e Por Que sou Romancista (1873)

Critics and polemics
 Cartas sobre A Confederação dos Tamoios (1856)
 Cartas Políticas de Erasmo (1865 — 1866)
 O Sistema Representativo (1866)

References

External links

 
 
 
 José de Alencar's biography at the official site of the Brazilian Academy of Letters 
 A biography of Alencar at the official site of Messejana 

1829 births
1877 deaths
Brazilian Roman Catholics
Brazilian male novelists
19th-century Brazilian lawyers
Brazilian monarchists
Critics of Freemasonry
Conservative Party (Brazil) politicians
Brazilian autobiographers
Brazilian male dramatists and playwrights
People from Fortaleza
People from Ceará
Portuguese-language writers
University of São Paulo alumni
Writers from Rio de Janeiro (city)
19th-century Brazilian dramatists and playwrights
Patrons of the Brazilian Academy of Letters
19th-century deaths from tuberculosis
Brazilian essayists
19th-century Brazilian novelists
19th-century Brazilian male writers
Tuberculosis deaths in Rio de Janeiro (state)
Ministers of Justice of Brazil